Consulting the Oracle is an oil on canvas painting by John William Waterhouse. Waterhouse painted it in 1884; according to Anthony Hobson, "The Illustrated London News described it as one of the principal works of the year". Hobson describes the work as having a "keyhole composition" because a partial ring of women focus upon a single other (the priestess).

Hobson goes on to say that the painting helps "to establish Waterhouse as a classical painter" because of his use of "classical, geometrical structures...the vertical, the horizontal and the circle". When he adds the diagonal, as "in the inclined figure of the priestess" and the out-of-place rug, it is a deliberately added tension.

References

1884 paintings
Paintings by John William Waterhouse
Collection of the Tate galleries
Witches in art